This Kind of Love is the 22nd studio album by American singer-songwriter Carly Simon, released by Hear Music, on April 29, 2008. 

Simon's first album of original material since The Bedroom Tapes in 2000, it is also her most recent album to date consisting of brand new songs. It debuted at No. 15 on the U.S. Billboard 200 chart, selling about 23,000 copies in its first week. By late 2009, the album had sold 124,000 copies.

Background
This Kind of Love was released via the Starbucks-owned label Hear Music and was to be sold in Starbucks outlets as well as by general music retailers. To Simon's disappointment, Starbucks announced that it had ceased day-to-day operations of Hear Music five days before the release date of This Kind of Love. Starbucks reneged on its agreement to stock the album in stores and reduced her advance after Simon had spent $100,000 on recording sessions in Martha's Vineyard. In 2009, Simon sued Starbucks for "concealment of material facts", "tortious interference" with Simon's contract, and "unlawful, unfair and fraudulent business practices". Simon's lawsuit was dismissed in favor of Starbucks.

Production
Simon cited Brazilian music as an influence for the thirteen-song album. She worked on the album for two years.

Reception

This Kind of Love received general acclaim from music critics. Writing for AllMusic, Thom Jurek stated "the aching ‘So Many People to Love’ is a sparse, spontaneous, sadly sweet finger-popping swing tune... this is the kind of pop song that is perfect for Simon's voice." The track "Hold Out Your Heart" was also singled out for praise; "The skeletal guitar that accompanies her on the first lines are quietly stunning. When the strings and backing vocals enter, they wipe away the years of ‘pop music progression’ and take listeners back to a purer time -- when lyrics would communicate in sync with music written specifically to offer a dramatic aural portrait of an emotional slice of life or an episodic one. It's graceful and quite beautiful when it reaches up and everything swells." He concluded: "This is the best album of mostly original material she's cut since 1979's Spy."

The Boston Globe stated "her voice is huskier, veined with the fine lines of age, but that only enhances the sultry sound of the Vineyard's favorite songbird, the still-too-sexy-for-her-shirt Carly Simon. The original songs on This Kind of Love are a mishmash of styles: poppy, jazzy, or seasoned with a dash of Brazilian Tropicana. Thirty-six years after her breakthrough No Secrets, Simon is still exploring the vicissitudes of togetherness."

Writing for PopMatters, Steve Horowitz was also enthusiastic, rating the album 8 out of 10 stars and writing "Simon has prodigious gifts that seem so effortless that it’s easy to mistake the laidback elements of her songs for laziness. That would definitely be a mistake. The carefree aspect of her music disguises the intensity of the underlying feelings expressed. Simon’s artistry can be found in how she expresses the tension between these conflicting elements," continuing "Simon uses Brazilian rhythms to create a calm façade as she sings about life, love, and death. The music mostly sways like a gentle, tropical breeze. She sings in an unhurried fashion, rarely revving up the tempo, instead letting the percussion section do that for her. And she rarely stretches for a note. That famous ache in her voice so prominent in her early work from the ‘70s is rarely found here. Instead, she sounds mellow... Don’t mistake its pleasant surfaces for laidback listening. There’s much more to it than initially meets the ear."

Track listing
Credits adapted from the album's liner notes.

Credits

Musicians

Production

Charts

References

External links
 Carly Simon's Official Website
This Kind Of Love Official web page

2008 albums
Carly Simon albums
Albums produced by Frank Filipetti
Albums produced by Jimmy Webb
Hear Music albums